Læderstræde 5 is a Neoclassical property situated on Strædet, close to Højbro Plads, in the Old Town of Copenhagen, Denmark. A private sunagogue was from 1800 to 1836 and again from 1845 to 1986 based on the first floor of the building. The second synagogue was opened by Moses Levy and was for many years the only alternative to the Great Synagogue in Krystalgade. In his will, Levy converted the building into a foundation under the name Moses Levt's Stiftelse og Synagoge. The building was listed in the Danish registry of protected buildings and places in 1945. The publishing house Tiderne Skifter is now based on the first floor.

History

18th century

In the late 17th century, the site was part of a larger property. It was listed listed in Copenhagen's first cadastre pf 1689 as No. 22 in Strand Quarter, owned by Henrik Werner. The property was later divided into two separate properties. The western property (now Læderstræde 5) was listed in the new cadastre of 1756 as No. 23 and was at that time owned by  Afd. Henriksen. The eastern property (now Læderstræde 3) was listed as No. 24, owned by  Søren Madsen. No. 23 was located at the corner of Læderstræde and Nissegangen. Nissegangen, literally "The Nisse Corridor", was a narrow alleyway linking Læderstræde with Gammel Strand.

The property was later acquired by the Jewish merchant Isack Jacob. He had come to Copenhagen from Moisling in 1739. He and his family occupied most of the building at the time of the 1787 census. Isack Jacob resided in one of the apartments with his wife Sara and one maid. Meyer Isack	(1747 – 11 June 1791), one of his sons and also a merchant, resided in another apartment with his wife Eva, their six children (aged four to 13) and two maids. Salomon Isack, another son and merchant, resided in the building with his wife Blümcke, their eight children and two maids. Berent Nathan, another Jewish merchant, resided in the building with his wife Marthe. Christen Christensen, proprietor of a tavern, probably in the basement, resided in the associated dwelling with his wife Anne Chierstine Jørgens Datter, their three-year-old son and one maid.

Salomon Isack and Bendix Salomon, 1800–1937
The property was destroyed in the Copenhagen Fire of 1795, together with most of the other buildings in the area. The present  building on the site was constructed by master carpenter Henrich Kaiser in 1797–1800. Nissegangen was not reconstructed after the fire. The property was acquired by Solomon Isack in 1800. He opened a family synagogue on the first floor.

At the time of the 1801 census, No. 23 was home to six households. Salomon Isack resided in one of the apartments with his wife, their now four children and two maids. Thor St. Dahl, a harbour secretary, resided in the building with his wife Cathrine Adelgonde Amendinm their three children (aged one to four), his mother Marthe Dahlberg, his brother Mette Dahlberg, two lodgers and one maid. Ole Olsen, a bookkeeper, resided in the third apartment with his three children (aged three to seven) and one maid. Poul Jørgensen, a pottery seller, resided in the building with his wife Marie Kirstine Jørgensen, their two children (aged seven to nine) and one maid. Peder Larsen, who worked for the artillery, resided in the building with his wife Karen Kirstine Svendsdatter, their four children (aged one to 20) and his wife's sister Johanne Marie Svendsdatter. Johan David Kyster, a bricklayer, resided in the building with his wife Ane Frantzen, their three children (aged eight to 13) and his wife's sister Birgitte [Frantzen].

The property was listed as No. 24 in the new cadastre of 1806. In 1917, Isack ceded the property to his eldest son Bendix. He continued the synagogue on the first floor.

Hans and Anne Margrethe Olsen, 1836–1943
In 1836 Bendix Salomon sold his property to Hans Olsen. It was after his death owned by his widow Anne Margrethe Olsen.

Anne Margrethe Olsen was not herself among the residents at the time of the 1840 census. The property was home to eight households at that time, two on each floor. Bendix Salomon, its former owner, resided in one of the second floor apartment with his wife Frederikke Bendixen, their three children (aged 17 to 22) and one maid. Sally Salomon (1813–1882), a clerk, resided in one of the second floor apartments with his wife Birgitte Salomon, their one-year-old daughter Pauline Salomon and one maid.  Moses Levy, a grandson of Meyer Isach, had just taken over one of the apartments on the first floor. He lived there with his wife Frederikke Levy, their 13-year-old daughter Helene Levy, a couple of other relatives and lodgers and one maid. Sally Salomon (1813–1882), a clerk, resided in one of the second floor apartments with his wife Birgitte Salomon (Moses Levy's sister), their one-year-old daughter Pauline Salomon and one maid. Samuel Marcus Hartvig, a glass merchant, resided on the ground floor with his wife Adelheidt Hartvig, their three children (aged one to 12), two maids and one lodger. The two apartments in the basement were occupied by the proprietor of a tavern (to the right) and a master shoemaker (to the left) with their respective families and employees.

Moses Levy and his synagogue
 
Moses Levy purchased the property in 1843. His mother Pauline (Perle) Meyer was the daughter of Meyer Isach. His father  Heyman Levy Koch, a wealthy stockbroker, had come to Copenhagen from Amsterdam in 1790, to marry Levy's mother. Moses Levy was a successful businessman as well as an authorized agent for the State Lottery. He had accumulated a considerable portfolio of properties throughout the city.

Levy had for years been a central figure in the city's Orthodox community and a very active voice in the prolonged confrontation between tradition and modernity in the Jewish community. He waged a life-long struggle against the Chief Rabbi, Abraham Wolff, whom he mistrusted deeply, fearing that he would reform the service in the Great Synagogue in Krystalgade. In 1945, he therefore opened a private synagogue on the first floor of his building in Læderstræde. It was for many years the only alternative to the Great Synagogue in Krystalgade. He thereby disregarded the authorities’ demand that all the private synagogues should desist with the opening of the central synagogue in 1833. The violation was ignored both by the authorities and by Wolf.

At the time of the 1845 census, No. 24 was home to 62 residents.

At the time of the 1850 census, No. 24 was home to 60 residents in eight households. Moses Levy resided in one of the first floor apartments with his wife and one maid. Ole Møller, a gilder, resided in the other first floor apartment with his wife Sophie Senger and their three children (aged 14 to 19). Samuel Hartvig resided in one of the second floor apartments with his wife, their three children (aged 12 to 22) and one maid. Heinrich Holst, a master tailor, resided in the other second floor apartment with his wife Oline Olsen, their two-year-old son and one maid. Jørgen Heins, the proprietor of a tavern, resided on the ground floor with his wife Johanne Sletz and their five children (aged seven to 27). Søren Hansen, another proprietor of a tavern, resided in the other ground floor apartment with his wife Anna Hansen, their six-year-old daughter and one maid. Niels Jønch, a master shoemaker, resided in the basement with his wife Niels Hansen, an apprentice and a maid. Caroline Hansen, a widow employed with needlework, was also residing in the basement with her 14-year-old daughter. Another 25 residents, mostly young, unmarried craftsmen or widows, most of them employed with needlework, resided in the garret.

Moses and Frederikke Levy bad two daughters. The elder of them died as a child. The younger daughter Helene was married to Joseph Perlstein from Altona. Her elder sister had died as a child.

Moses Levys Stiftelse og Synagoge 18651986
In his will, Levy left most of his large estate to his daughter and son-in-law. However, Læderstræde 5, with the synagogue, was turned into a foundation under the name Moses Levys Stiftelse og Synagoge. This was done to be preserve the synagogue for future generations of the family, in order to maintain strictly Orthodox tradition independently of the main community. Frederikke died in Copenhagen in 1865 and Moses died later the same year during a visit to Altona.

The synagogue was closed between October 1943 and May 1945, when most of the Danish Jews were in exile in Sweden. Members of the Great Synagogue in Krystalgade initially attended the Shul until the Krystalgade Synagogue reopened in June 1945. The Great Synagogue had been vandalized by the Nazis during the German occupation of Denmark.

The synagogue closed in 1955. In New York, Lubavitcher Rebbe Bamberger told Menachem Mendel Schneerson. He offered to take over the premises. A yeshiva was subsequently opened in the building under the leadership of Azriel Chaikin. The building had fallen into a state of neglect and was sold at auction in the mid-1970s.

Architecture
Læderstræde 5 is constructed with three storeys over a walk-out basement. The building is ten bays long with slightly projecting outer bays. The plastered facade is finished with a belt course above the ground floor, an embedded Greek key frieze between the four central windows of the two upper floors and a simple cornice. A gateway is located in the two central bays and the two basement entrances are located in the fourth and 10th bay. An opening in the eastern wall of the gateway provides access to the main staircase of the building. The pitched roof is clad with red tile and features five dormer windows towards the street and five dormer windows towards the yard. The roof ridge is pierced by two chimneys. The building is towards the yard rendered iron vitriol yellow. A two-bay-long two-storey appendix projects from the rear side of the building at its western end. It was constructed in 1870.

Today
Læderstræde 5 is owned by  K/S Althor. It contains a combination of residential apartments and office space. The publishing house Tiderne Skifter is among the tenants.

Gallery

See also
 Henriette Melchiors Stiftelse

References

External links

 Mayer Isac at geni.com
 Vintage photo, 1055
 Vintage photo, 1955
 Source
 Spirce
 Source
 Source

Listed residential buildings in Copenhagen
Neoclassical architecture in Copenhagen
Judaism in Copenhagen
Synagogues in Denmark